The 1981–82 NBA season was the Bullets’ 21st season in the NBA and their ninth in the city of Washington, D.C. The Bullets finished 43–39 and won their first playoff round against the New Jersey Nets. They lost the semifinals to a powerful Boston Celtic outfit and their Nets win would prove their last playoff series win until 2004–05 against the Chicago Bulls.

Draft picks

Roster

Regular season

Season standings

Notes
 z, y – division champions
 x – clinched playoff spot

Record vs. opponents

Game log

Regular season

|- align="center" bgcolor="#ffcccc"
| 1
| October 30
| @ Boston
| L 100–124
|
|
|
| Boston Garden
| 0–1

|- align="center" bgcolor="#ffcccc"
| 2
| November 3
| Philadelphia
| L 99–112
|
|
|
| Capital Centre
| 0–2
|- align="center" bgcolor="#ffcccc"
| 3
| November 5
| @ Milwaukee
| L 90–98
|
|
|
| MECCA Arena
| 0–3
|- align="center" bgcolor="#ccffcc"
| 4
| November 6
| Detroit
| W 86–82
|
|
|
| Capital Centre
| 1–3
|- align="center" bgcolor="#ffcccc"
| 5
| November 10
| Boston
| L 84–90
|
|
|
| Capital Centre
| 1–4
|- align="center" bgcolor="#ccffcc"
| 6
| November 12
| @ Atlanta
| W 95–87
|
|
|
| The Omni
| 2–4
|- align="center" bgcolor="#ccffcc"
| 7
| November 14
| Chicago
| W 104–99
|
|
|
| Capital Centre
| 3–4
|- align="center" bgcolor="#ffcccc"
| 8
| November 17
| Milwaukee
| L 95–99
|
|
|
| Capital Centre
| 3–5
|- align="center" bgcolor="#ffcccc"
| 9
| November 19
| @ Detroit
| L 97–122
|
|
|
| Pontiac Silverdome
| 3–6
|- align="center" bgcolor="#ffcccc"
| 10
| November 20
| Houston
| L 94–95
|
|
|
| Capital Centre
| 3–7
|- align="center" bgcolor="#ffcccc"
| 11
| November 21
| @ Chicago
| L 105–117
|
|
|
| Chicago Stadium
| 3–8
|- align="center" bgcolor="#ccffcc"
| 12
| November 24
| Golden State
| W 107–88
|
|
|
| Capital Centre
| 4–8
|- align="center" bgcolor="#ffcccc"
| 13
| November 27
| @ Boston
| L 100–113
|
|
|
| Boston Garden
| 4–9
|- align="center" bgcolor="#ffcccc"
| 14
| November 28
| Indiana
| L 90–92
|
|
|
| Capital Centre
| 4–10

|- align="center" bgcolor="#ffcccc"
| 15
| December 1
| San Antonio
| L 99–110
|
|
|
| Capital Centre
| 4–11
|- align="center" bgcolor="#ccffcc"
| 16
| December 3
| @ New York
| W 114–88
|
|
|
| Madison Square Garden
| 5–11
|- align="center" bgcolor="#ccffcc"
| 17
| December 5
| Cleveland
| W 94–87
|
|
|
| Capital Centre
| 6–11
|- align="center" bgcolor="#ffcccc"
| 18
| December 8
| @ Los Angeles
| L 98–102
|
|
|
| The Forum
| 6–12
|- align="center" bgcolor="#ccffcc"
| 19
| December 11
| @ San Diego
| W 106–102
|
|
|
| San Diego Sports Arena
| 7–12
|- align="center" bgcolor="#ccffcc"
| 20
| December 12
| @ Phoenix
| W 105–98
|
|
|
| Arizona Veterans Memorial Coliseum
| 8–12
|- align="center" bgcolor="#ffcccc"
| 21
| December 15
| Dallas
| L 102–107
|
|
|
| Capital Centre
| 8–13
|- align="center" bgcolor="#ccffcc"
| 22
| December 16
| @ Cleveland
| W 106–102
|
|
|
| Richfield Coliseum
| 9–13
|- align="center" bgcolor="#ffcccc"
| 23
| December 18
| Boston
| L 98–99
|
|
|
| Capital Centre
| 9–14
|- align="center" bgcolor="#ffcccc"
| 24
| December 22
| @ Chicago
| L 90–92
|
|
|
| Chicago Stadium
| 9–15
|- align="center" bgcolor="#ccffcc"
| 25
| December 25
| Indiana
| W 115–98
|
|
|
| Capital Centre
| 10–15
|- align="center" bgcolor="#ccffcc"
| 26
| December 26
| @ New Jersey
| W 105–90
|
|
|
| Brendan Byrne Arena
| 11–15
|- align="center" bgcolor="#ccffcc"
| 27
| December 29
| Detroit
| W 129–125
|
|
|
| Capital Centre
| 12–15
|- align="center" bgcolor="#ffcccc"
| 28
| December 30
| @ Milwaukee
| L 103–107
|
|
|
| MECCA Arena
| 12–16

|- align="center" bgcolor="#ccffcc"
| 29
| January 2
| @ Indiana
| W 107–103
|
|
|
| Market Square Arena
| 13–16
|- align="center" bgcolor="#ffcccc"
| 30
| January 5
| New Jersey
| L 108–114
|
|
|
| Capital Centre
| 13–17
|- align="center" bgcolor="#ffcccc"
| 31
| January 6
| @ Philadelphia
| L 112–116
|
|
|
| The Spectrum
| 13–18
|- align="center" bgcolor="#ccffcc"
| 32
| January 7
| @ Cleveland
| W 109–100
|
|
|
| Richfield Coliseum
| 14–18
|- align="center" bgcolor="#ccffcc"
| 33
| January 10
| @ New York
| W 129–126 (OT)
|
|
|
| Madison Square Garden
| 15–18
|- align="center" bgcolor="#ffcccc"
| 34
| January 12
| Philadelphia
| L 92–95
|
|
|
| Capital Centre
| 15–19
|- align="center" bgcolor="#ccffcc"
| 35
| January 14
| @ Detroit
| W 121–114
|
|
|
| Pontiac Silverdome
| 16–19
|- align="center" bgcolor="#ccffcc"
| 36
| January 15
| Chicago
| W 93–90
|
|
|
| Capital Centre
| 17–19
|- align="center" bgcolor="#ccffcc"
| 37
| January 17
| Atlanta
| W 96–78
|
|
|
| Capital Centre
| 18–19
|- align="center" bgcolor="#ccffcc"
| 38
| January 20
| Seattle
| W 106–95
|
|
|
| Capital Centre
| 19–19
|- align="center" bgcolor="#ccffcc"
| 39
| January 22
| Portland
| W 110–97
|
|
|
| Capital Centre
| 20–19
|- align="center" bgcolor="#ccffcc"
| 41
| January 23
| @ Kansas City
| W 109–106 (OT)
|
|
|
| Kemper Arena
| 21–19
|- align="center" bgcolor="#ccffcc"
| 41
| January 26
| Chicago
| W 94–84
|
|
|
| Capital Centre
| 22–19
|- align="center" bgcolor="#ffcccc"
| 42
| January 28
| New York
| L 98–102
|
|
|
| Capital Centre
| 22–20

|- align="center" bgcolor="#ffcccc"
| 43
| February 2
| Cleveland
| L 99–100
|
|
|
| Capital Centre
| 22–21
|- align="center" bgcolor="#ffcccc"
| 44
| February 3
| @ Philadelphia
| L 96–122
|
|
|
| The Spectrum
| 22–22
|- align="center" bgcolor="#ffcccc"
| 45
| February 5
| Los Angeles
| L 87–90
|
|
|
| Capital Centre
| 22–23
|- align="center" bgcolor="#ffcccc"
| 46
| February 7
| Denver
| L 115–124
|
|
|
| Capital Centre
| 22–24
|- align="center" bgcolor="#ccffcc"
| 47
| February 9
| @ San Antonio
| W 112–110
|
|
|
| HemisFair Arena
| 23–24
|- align="center" bgcolor="#ccffcc"
| 48
| February 10
| @ Dallas
| W 119–102
|
|
|
| Reunion Arena
| 24–24
|- align="center" bgcolor="#ffcccc"
| 49
| February 13
| @ Houston
| L 104–111
|
|
|
| The Summit
| 24–25
|- align="center" bgcolor="#ccffcc"
| 50
| February 16
| @ Portland
| W 100–97
|
|
|
| Memorial Coliseum
| 25–25
|- align="center" bgcolor="#ffcccc"
| 51
| February 18
| @ Seattle
| L 87–105
|
|
|
| Kingdome
| 25–26
|- align="center" bgcolor="#ffcccc"
| 52
| February 20
| @ Golden State
| L 102–110
|
|
|
| Oakland–Alameda County Coliseum Arena
| 25–27
|- align="center" bgcolor="#ffcccc"
| 53
| February 23
| Utah
| L 106–113
|
|
|
| Capital Centre
| 25–28
|- align="center" bgcolor="#ccffcc"
| 54
| February 26
| Kansas City
| W 100–98
|
|
|
| Capital Centre
| 26–28
|- align="center" bgcolor="#ccffcc"
| 55
| February 28
| New York
| W 113–109 (OT)
|
|
|
| Capital Centre
| 27–28

|- align="center" bgcolor="#ffcccc"
| 56
| March 2
| New Jersey
| L 124–130 (2OT)
|
|
|
| Capital Centre
| 27–29
|- align="center" bgcolor="#ffcccc"
| 57
| March 5
| @ Denver
| L 126–127
|
|
|
| McNichols Sports Arena
| 27–30
|- align="center" bgcolor="#ccffcc"
| 58
| March 6
| @ Utah
| W 127–113
|
|
|
| Salt Palace Acord Arena
| 28–30
|- align="center" bgcolor="#ffcccc"
| 59
| March 9
| Phoenix
| L 95–103
|
|
|
| Capital Centre
| 28–31
|- align="center" bgcolor="#ccffcc"
| 60
| March 12
| Indiana
| W 110–105
|
|
|
| Capital Centre
| 29–31
|- align="center" bgcolor="#ccffcc"
| 61
| March 13
| @ New York
| W 109–99
|
|
|
| Madison Square Garden
| 30–31
|- align="center" bgcolor="#ccffcc"
| 62
| March 14
| Atlanta
| W 92–85
|
|
|
| Capital Centre
| 31–31
|- align="center" bgcolor="#ffcccc"
| 63
| March 16
| Boston
| L 97–98 (OT)
|
|
|
| Capital Centre
| 31–32
|- align="center" bgcolor="#ffcccc"
| 64
| March 17
| @ Philadelphia
| L 93–102
|
|
|
| The Spectrum
| 31–33
|- align="center" bgcolor="#ccffcc"
| 65
| March 19
| San Diego
| W 108–98
|
|
|
| Capital Centre
| 32–33
|- align="center" bgcolor="#ccffcc"
| 66
| March 21
| New York
| W 110–109
|
|
|
| Capital Centre
| 33–33
|- align="center" bgcolor="#ffcccc"
| 67
| March 23
| @ Atlanta
| L 87–107
|
|
|
| The Omni
| 33–34
|- align="center" bgcolor="#ccffcc"
| 68
| March 24
| @ Indiana
| W 114–106
|
|
|
| Market Square Arena
| 34–34
|- align="center" bgcolor="#ccffcc"
| 69
| March 26
| New Jersey
| W 104–88
|
|
|
| Capital Centre
| 35–34
|- align="center" bgcolor="#ccffcc"
| 70
| March 28
| @ Cleveland
| W 104–101
|
|
|
| Richfield Coliseum
| 36–34
|- align="center" bgcolor="#ccffcc"
| 71
| March 30
| Detroit
| W 127–98
|
|
|
| Capital Centre
| 37–34
|- align="center" bgcolor="#ffcccc"
| 72
| March 31
| @ Boston
| L 109–119
|
|
|
| Boston Garden
| 37–35

|- align="center" bgcolor="#ffcccc"
| 73
| April 2
| @ New Jersey
| L 96–98
|
|
|
| Brendan Byrne Arena
| 37–36
|- align="center" bgcolor="#ffcccc"
| 74
| April 3
| @ Atlanta
| L 101–106
|
|
|
| The Omni
| 37–37
|- align="center" bgcolor="#ccffcc"
| 75
| April 6
| Cleveland
| W 94–85
|
|
|
| Capital Centre
| 38–37
|- align="center" bgcolor="#ccffcc"
| 76
| April 7
| @ Indiana
| W 97–85
|
|
|
| Market Square Arena
| 39–37
|- align="center" bgcolor="#ccffcc"
| 77
| April 9
| @ Chicago
| W 114–98
|
|
|
| Chicago Stadium
| 40–37
|- align="center" bgcolor="#ccffcc"
| 78
| April 10
| Milwaukee
| W 115–114
|
|
|
| Capital Centre
| 41–37
|- align="center" bgcolor="#ccffcc"
| 79
| April 13
| @ Milwaukee
| W 109–99
|
|
|
| MECCA Arena
| 42–37
|- align="center" bgcolor="#ffcccc"
| 80
| April 14
| @ New Jersey
| L 94–98
|
|
|
| Brendan Byrne Arena
| 42–38
|- align="center" bgcolor="#ffcccc"
| 81
| April 16
| Philadelphia
| L 96–100
|
|
|
| Capital Centre
| 42–39
|- align="center" bgcolor="#ccffcc"
| 82
| April 18
| Atlanta
| W 99–96
|
|
|
| Capital Centre
| 43–39

Playoffs

|- align="center" bgcolor="#ccffcc"
| 1
| April 20
| @ New Jersey
| W 96–83
| Jeff Ruland (18)
| Jeff Ruland (20)
| Frank Johnson (11)
| Brendan Byrne Arena14,015
| 1–0
|- align="center" bgcolor="#ccffcc"
| 2
| April 23
| New Jersey
| W 103–92
| Kevin Grevey (23)
| Rick Mahorn (11)
| Frank Johnson (9)
| Capital Centre19,035
| 2–0
|-

|-
|- align="center" bgcolor="#ffcccc"
| 1
| April 25
| @ Boston
| L 91–109
| Spencer Haywood (17)
| Greg Ballard (9)
| Frank Johnson (6)
| Boston Garden15,320
| 0–1
|- align="center" bgcolor="#ccffcc"
| 2
| April 28
| @ Boston
| W 103–102
| Johnson, Haywood (26)
| Jeff Ruland (10)
| Frank Johnson (8)
| Boston Garden15,320
| 1–1
|- align="center" bgcolor="#ffcccc"
| 3
| May 1
| Boston
| L 83–92
| Spencer Haywood (19)
| Rick Mahorn (14)
| Frank Johnson (8)
| Capital Centre15,035
| 1–2
|- align="center" bgcolor="#ffcccc"
| 4
| May 2
| Boston
| L 99–103 (OT)
| Spencer Haywood (28)
| Rick Mahorn (10)
| Frank Johnson (7)
| Capital Centre16,295
| 1–3
|- align="center" bgcolor="#ffcccc"
| 5
| May 5
| @ Boston
| L 126–131 (2OT)
| Jeff Ruland (33)
| Jeff Ruland (13)
| Frank Johnson (10)
| Boston Garden15,320
| 1–4
|-

Player statistics

Season

Playoffs

Awards and records
 Gene Shue, NBA Coach of the Year Award
 Bob Ferry, NBA Executive of the Year Award
 Jeff Ruland, NBA All-Rookie Team 1st Team

Transactions

References

See also
 1981–82 NBA season

Washington Wizards seasons
Wash
Washing
Washing